Chinese Blackjack is also known as 21-point, ban-luck (Hokkien), ban-nag (Cantonese), and xì dách (Vietnamese). The game is played in South East Asia and resembles conventional Blackjack. In Malaysia, this variant is known as Kampung (Village) Blackjack to differentiate it from the standard Casino Blackjack, and it grew from the game played in the old days in villages.

Traditionally, most casual gamblers gamble during the Chinese New Year; it is believed the new year brings in fresh new luck. Chinese Blackjack is one of the most popular games played during the new year.

The game uses one or two 52-card deck(s) and is playable by any number of players. One is the dealer, or they may take turns dealing.

The game probably evolved from the fact that amongst friends, it is hard to host a casino rules blackjack game that needs a dealer who plays differently from the players. In casino rules, the cards are opened, and the dealer must play at least until 17 points but must stand once reached, while the players have no limits. This is complicated for a home friendly game, and it appears that the odds are stacked against the dealer. So most friends don't volunteer to be the dealer.

A unique feature is that the dealer is allowed to selectively reveal some players' hands, settle bets with them and then hit again and reveal other players' hands. Another unique feature is a special status given to owning 5 cards unbusted.

Although Chinese Blackjack has some standard rules, unusual house rules are common.

Kampung Blackjack

In Malaysian kampung blackjack, which is likely to be a derivative of the original Chinese Blackjack, ('Kampung' means village in Malay) the following rules apply:
 All hands including the dealer must reach at least 15 points (reached 'license' or 'passport'), or a penalty applies (usually the offender has to pay all players).
 The maximum number of cards to be drawn is 5 only.
 A burn rule may apply to make things more exciting. Players receiving the initial 2 cards of 15 points may get a new lease of luck by drawing a fresh set of cards by doubling up their original bet. It gets interesting when the dealer does the burn, as all players must then double up as well. Players may choose not to 'burn' with the dealer by forfeiting the bet.
 A Blackjack is one that has 21 points achieved by a ten/picture card + an ace, and usually is paid as 1:2.
 In addition, other special winning conditions apply: 
 Any combination to 21 points (usually paid out as 1:2), drawn to a maximum of 5 cards.
 Surviving unbusted at 5 cards (usually 1:2 depending on house rules).
 Unbusted at 5 cards AND 21  (usually 1:3 depending on house rules).
 Triple 7 21 (usually a big payout from 1:5 to 1:21, depending on house rules).
 Unlike Chinese Blackjack described below, pairs has no winning privileges.
 Players to reveal busted cards (depending on house rules)
 The dealer's turn is always last. They may choose selectively open the hands of the players, and make an immediate payout/collect according to the points they have at hand. After that, they may continue to hit himself to chance if they can get higher points, or bust. This feature gives a perception of 'another lifeline' as the dealer with a bad card like 16 or 17 points can eliminate players with 3 or 4 cards on the likelihood that they have busted, before attempting another attempt to beat players with 2 cards which are likely to be good cards (18 to 21).

Apart from the above, the game is similar to the Chinese Blackjack described below.

Dealing
Players place their bets. The dealer shuffles the cards thoroughly and to prevent dealer cheating, one player may "cut the hand" by which a player take a number of cards off from the shuffled deck before dealing begins. The dealer may deal the cards clock or anti-clockwise, and may choose to deal himself first or last. All cards face down. They deal two cards per person and put back the extra cards to the "cut hand".

Point counting rules
 K, Q, J = 10
 10, 9, 8, 7, 6, 5, 4, 3, 2 = respective face value
 If your total number of cards is 2, then Ace = 11 or 10
 If your total number of cards is 3, then Ace = 10 or 1
 If your total number of cards is 4 or 5, then Ace = 1

Checking for Blackjack
Each player including the dealer checks their hand for the following special combinations
 Ace + Ace = ban-ban
 Ace + (10/J/Q/K) = ban-luck
 15 points = free hand
 7-7-7

Ban-Ban
If a player receives a ban-ban, they are deemed to have won their bet tripled from the dealer immediately, unless the dealer receives a ban-ban (a tie) or a free hand (an escape).

If the dealer receives a ban-ban, they are deemed to have won all player bets tripled immediately, unless the player receives a ban-ban (a tie) or a free hand (an escape).

Ban-Luck
If a player receives a ban-luck, they win their bet doubled from the dealer immediately, unless the dealer has a ban-ban (player loses), or a ban-luck (a tie), or a free hand (an escape).

If the dealer receives a ban-luck, they win all player bets doubled immediately, unless the player has a ban-ban (dealer loses), or a ban-luck too (a tie), or a free hand (an escape).

A  player may instantly reveal their hand as soon as it is dealt to receive their remuneration from the Dealer.

15 Points (No Man's Land)
If the dealer has a free hand, they may decide to continue or not to continue with the game. 
If he chooses not to, then the cards shall be collected back, reshuffled and dealt again.

7-7-7 (House Rule)
If player hits on a pair of 7 and obtains 7 as the third card, player wins their bet 21 fold. If the dealer has a hand of 21 then the deal is canceled off.

The players' turns
After checking for Blackjack, each player takes turn to make the following decisions, depending on the conditions. The player may add more than one card.

 total < 16, hit (add one card).
 total >= 16 and < 21, hit or stand.
 total = 21, stand.
 total > 21, busts.
If the player has 5 cards on their hands, they must reveal their cards
 number of cards = 5 (5-Dragon), collect win from dealer immediately, double the bet.
 number of cards = 5 and total = 21, collect win from dealer immediately, triple the bet. (House Rule)
 number of cards = 5 and total > 21, lose double the bet to dealer immediately.

The dealer's turn
After all players are done, the dealer has to make the following decisions, depending on the conditions. The dealer may hit more than one card.

 total < 16, hit (add one card).
 total >= 16 and < 21, hit or reveal some players' hands then hit.
 total = 21, reveal all players' cards.
 total > 21, dealer busts.
 number of cards = 5 (5-Dragon), collect win from players immediately, double all bets.
 number of cards = 5 and total = 21, collect win from players immediately, triple all bets. (House Rule)
 number of cards = 5 and total > 21, lose to players whose hands have not been revealed yet (regardless of whether the player busts or not), double all bets.

If the dealer chooses to reveal a player's hand (only if they have at least 16 points at any time),

If the dealer has not busted
 player busts or total of dealer > total of player, dealer wins the bet (double if dealer has 21 points (House Rule) )
 total of dealer = total of player, tie.
 total of dealer < total of player, player wins, (double if player has 21 points (House Rule) ) 

If the dealer busts (with less than 5 cards on their hand), the dealer pays all players their bets (double if player has 21 points (House Rule) ) unless the player also busts.

After the dealer has settled with all players, the cards are collected back and a new round begins.

References

External links
Blackjack Tactics

Chinese card games
Blackjack